Richard Meyer (September 6, 1952 – May 14, 2012) was an American folk singer-songwriter, writer, painter, and set designer. Meyer was active in the Greenwich Village folk music scene of the 1980s and 1990s and did much to promote other artists.  As one of the leaders of a musicians cooperative in the Village he handled booking at the SpeakEasy and edited Fast Folk Musical Magazine (1986–1997). Later, he wrote reviews for various media such as AllMusic.  He also worked extensively as a lighting/scenery designer in theater.

Since the summer of 2008, Meyer's advancing Parkinson's disease made it impossible for him to live independently, and spent his last years at a nursing home in the New York area.

Discography 
 The January Cold (1984)
 Laughing/Scared (1987, Old Forge)
 The Good Life! (1992, Shanachie)
 A Letter from the Open Sky (1994, Shanachie)
 First Aid for the Choking Victim (?)
 Works in Progress (?)
 Strange Generosity/Bitter Moon (2001, Old Forge) [2-CD]

Video 
 "Richard Meyer at Cabin Concerts" is a 57:50 video of a house concert performance in Wayne, NJ 3/10/96.

References

Further reading 
 [ Richard Meyer] entry at Allmusic
 Dirty Linen, No. 40, June/July 1992 link to back issues
 (now defunct official web site)
"At the age of 56, Parkinson's Disease has trapped Richard in his own body.  We can help free him." by Torin Peterson, Wordpress.com June 13, 2008
 

1952 births
2012 deaths
American folk singers
American music journalists
American set designers
American singer-songwriters
Fast Folk artists
Shanachie Records artists